Chicago 16 is the thirteenth studio album by the American band Chicago, released on June 7, 1982. It is considered their "comeback" album because it was their first album to go platinum since 1978's Hot Streets. It made it into the Billboard 200 top ten, and produced their second number one single in the United States, "Hard to Say I'm Sorry." The album was certified gold by the Recording Industry Association of America (RIAA) in August, 1982, two months after its release, and platinum in December, 1982. "Hard to Say I'm Sorry" was nominated for a Grammy Award for Best Pop Performance by a Duo or Group with Vocal.

Chicago 16 was the first album in a decade-long association with their new label Warner Bros. Records; the band's first project to be produced by David Foster, who has been called the "key" to their comeback; their first album to include some songs exclusively by composers outside of the group; and is also the first album since Chicago VII (1974) not to feature Laudir de Oliveira as a band member.  It is also the first studio album to be released two years after the previous, as previous studio album were released annually.

Background
The band brought in Sons of Champlin founder Bill Champlin as keyboardist and singer. The group also retained Chris Pinnick from the Chicago XIV sessions. Through the band's manager, Jeff Wald, and on suggestion of Danny Seraphine, producer David Foster would make contact with the band.

Once they agreed to Foster producing the album (the band had considered him for 1980's Chicago XIV), Foster radically redefined Chicago's sound for the 1980s, with all of the latest technologies and techniques, and also brought in outside songwriters and studio players to the sessions. Three members of Toto lent their expertise to the sessions. In 2015 former Chicago drummer Danny Seraphine defended this choice to change their sound: 

The soft rock leanings of Peter Cetera and Foster permeate much of Chicago 16. The band was moving to a new label after an entire career at Columbia. Robert Lamm was also unavailable for the majority of the album's production because of personal issues, and the once-prolific writer only shared a sole partial writing credit on the release, with no lead vocal contributions. Lamm said of this change:  In an interview in 2019, Cetera described the initial songwriting efforts from band members that were presented to Foster as "pure shit," blaming alcohol and drug abuse in the band for the decline in the quality of songwriting. Eventually, Foster and Cetera collaborated to write the album's two hit singles.
Percussionist Laudir de Oliveira was dismissed from the band after the Chicago XIV tour, as his Latin-American style would not fit with the "more pop-oriented sound" of the band.

Upon its June 1982 release, Chicago 16 was a hit album, especially as "Hard to Say I'm Sorry" became the band's second number one US single, going to number one on both the Billboard Hot 100 chart and the Billboard Adult Contemporary chart. The album ultimately went platinum and reached number nine on the Billboard 200 chart. The single would also be included in its lengthier form "Hard to Say I'm Sorry/Get Away" on the Summer Lovers movie soundtrack. "Love Me Tomorrow", the second single lifted off the album, features a lengthy orchestration at the end. It went to number 22 on the Billboard Hot 100 chart and number eight on the Billboard Adult Contemporary chart. A third single, "What You're Missing", was released and peaked at number 81 on the Billboard Hot 100 chart.

The Rhino remaster does not include the full-length versions of "What You're Missing" and "Love Me Tomorrow." The former was replaced with its single edit, and the latter had two bars of the sequence (prominently featuring strings) that begins the instrumental bridge removed. However, this remastered version does include a Bill Champlin demo, called "Daddy's Favorite Fool", as a bonus track. A subsequent international release in 2010 (included in the Studio Albums 1979-2008 box set from 2015) has the original album restored, with additional bonus tracks of the single versions of "Hard To Say I'm Sorry", "What You're Missing", and Love Me Tomorrow" as well as "Daddy's Favorite Fool."

The original UK LP release contains "Rescue You" before "What Can I Say," unlike subsequent releases of this album.

Track listing

Outtakes
"Remember There's Someone Who Loves You" (Champlin, Lamm) and "Come On Back" (Bill Gable, Lamm) were recorded during the sessions and remain unreleased.

Personnel

Chicago 
 Peter Cetera – bass, acoustic guitar on "Hard To Say I'm Sorry", lead and backing vocals, BGV arrangements, rhythm arrangements
 Bill Champlin – keyboards, guitars, lead and backing vocals, BGV arrangements
 Robert Lamm – keyboards, backing vocals
 Lee Loughnane – trumpet, flugelhorn, piccolo trumpet
 James Pankow – trombone, horn arrangements
 Walter Parazaider – woodwinds
 Danny Seraphine – drums, rhythm arrangements

Additional personnel 
 David Foster – keyboards, synth bass, rhythm arrangements, additional horn arrangements
 David Paich – synthesizers
 Steve Porcaro – synthesizers, synthesizer programming
 Chris Pinnick – guitar
 Steve Lukather – guitar
 Michael Landau – guitar
 Jeremy Lubbock, Peter Cetera and David Foster – string arrangements on "Hard to Say I'm Sorry"
 Gerard Vinci – violin
 Dave Richardson – lyric assistance on "What Can I Say"

Production 
 Produced by David Foster
 Engineered and Mixed by Humberto Gatica
 "Hard To Say I'm Sorry/Get Away" mixed by Bill Schnee
 Mix assistance by Jack Goudie, Lee Loughnane and Walter Parazaider.
 Second Engineers – Britt Bacon, Jeff Borgeson, Steve Cohen, Bobby Gerber, Phil Jamtaas, Don Levy, David Schober, Ernie Sheesely and Chip Strader.
 Recorded at Bill Schnee Studios and Record Plant  (Los Angeles, CA); Davlen Sound Studios (Hollywood, CA); Skyline Recording (Topanga, CA).
 Mixed at Studio 55 (Los Angeles, CA).
 Photography by Aaron Rapoport
 Original Art Design and Direction by John Kosh and Ron Larson

Reissue
 A&R/Project Supervisors – Lee Loughnane, Jeff Magid and Mike Engstrom.
 Bonus Selections mixed by David Donnelly and Jeff Magid
 Remastering – David Donnelly
 Editorial Supervision – Cory Frye
 Art Direction and Design – Greg Allen
 Project Assistance – Steve Woolard and Karen LeBlanc

Charts

Weekly charts

Year-end charts

Certifications

References

Chicago (band) albums
1982 albums
Albums produced by David Foster
Full Moon Records albums
Warner Records albums